Globalism refers to various patterns of meaning beyond the merely international. It is used by political scientists, such as Joseph Nye, to describe "attempts to understand all the interconnections of the modern world—and to highlight patterns that underlie (and explain) them." While primarily associated with world-systems, it can be used to describe other global trends. The concept of globalism is also classically used to distinguish the ideologies of globalization (the subjective meanings) from the processes of globalization (the objective practices). In this sense, globalism is to globalization what nationalism is to nationality.

The term is now frequently used as a pejorative by far-right movements and conspiracy theorists. False usage in this way has also been associated with antisemitism, as antisemites frequently appropriate globalist to refer to Jews.

Definition 
Paul James defines globalism "at least in its more specific use ... as the dominant ideology and subjectivity associated with different historically-dominant formations of global extension. The definition thus implies that there were pre-modern or traditional forms of globalism and globalization long before the driving force of capitalism sought to colonize every corner of the globe, for example, going back to the Roman Empire in the second century AD, and perhaps to the Greeks of the fifth-century BC." Early ideas of globalism were also expressed by Adam Smith through his views on the role of commodities in distinguishing the civilized from the barbarous, which was deeply embedded in the ideology of empires.

Manfred Steger distinguishes among different globalisms such as justice globalism, jihad globalism, and market globalism. Market globalism includes the ideology of neoliberalism. In some hands, the reduction of globalism to the single ideology of market globalism and neoliberalism has led to confusion. In his 2005 book The Collapse of Globalism and the Reinvention of the World, Canadian philosopher John Ralston Saul treated globalism as coterminous with neoliberalism and neoliberal globalization. He argued that, far from being an inevitable force, globalization is already breaking up into contradictory pieces and that citizens are reasserting their national interests in both positive and destructive ways. 

Political scientists Joseph Nye and Robert Keohane, major thinkers of liberal institutionalism as a new international relations theory, generalized the term to argue that globalism refers to any description and explanation of a world which is characterized by networks of connections that span multi-continental distances, while globalization refers to the increase or decline in the degree of globalism. The term is used in a specific and narrow way to describe a position in the debate about the historical character of globalization, such as whether globalization is unprecedented or not. For example, this use of the term originated in, and continues to be used, in academic debates about the economic, social, and cultural developments that is described as globalization.

It has been used to describe international endeavours begun after World War II, such as the United Nations, the Warsaw Pact, the North Atlantic Treaty Organization and the European Union, and sometimes the later neoliberal and neoconservative policies of nation building and military interventionism between the end of the Cold War in 1991 and the beginning of the war on terror in 2001. Historically in the international relations of the 1970s and 1980s, globalism and regionalism had been defined somewhat differently due to the Cold War. Analysts discussed a globalism vs. regionalism dichotomy, in which globalists believed that international events more often arose from great power competition (then U.S.–Soviet rivalry), whereas regionalists believed they more often arose from local factors.

Concept 

The term first came into widespread usage in the United States. 
The modern concept of globalism arose in the post-war debates of the 1940s in the United States. In their position of unprecedented power, planners formulated policies to shape the kind of postwar world they wanted, which in economic terms meant a globe-spanning capitalist order centered exclusively upon the United States. This was the period when its global power was at its peak: the United States was the greatest economic power the world had ever known, with the greatest military machine in human history. In February 1948, George F. Kennan's Policy Planning Staff said: "[W]e have about 50% of the world's wealth but only 6.3% of its population. ... Our real task in the coming period is to devise a pattern of relationships which will permit us to maintain this position of disparity." America's allies and foes in Eurasia were still recovering from World War II at this time. Historian James Peck has described this version of globalism as "visionary globalism". Per Peck, this was a far-reaching conception of "American-centric state globalism using capitalism as a key to its global reach, integrating everything that it can into such an undertaking". This included global economic integration, which had collapsed under World War I and the Great Depression.

Modern globalism has been linked to the ideas of economic and political integration of countries and economies. The first person in the United States to use the term "economic integration" in its modern sense, such as combining separate economies into larger economic regions, was John S. de Beers, an economist in the United States Department of the Treasury, towards the end of 1941. By 1948, economic integration was appearing in an increasing number of American documents and speeches. Paul G. Hoffman, then head of the Economic Cooperation Administration, used the term in a 1949 speech to the Organisation for European Economic Co-operation. The New York Times summarized it thus:

Globalism emerged as a dominant set of ideologies in the late twentieth century. As these ideologies settled, and as various processes of globalization intensified, they contributed to the consolidation of a connecting global imaginary. In 2010, Manfred Steger and Paul James theorized this process in terms of four levels of change: changing ideas, ideologies, imaginaries and ontologies. Globalism has been seen as a pillar of a liberal international order along with democratic governance, open trade, and international institutions. At Brookings Institution, David G. Victor has suggested cooperation in carbon capture and storage technology could be a future element of globalism, as part of global efforts against climate change.

Right-wing usage 

Globalist has been used as a pejorative in right-wing and far-right politics, and in various conspiracy theories. During the election and presidency of United States president Donald Trump, he and members of his administration used the term globalist on multiple occasions. The administration was accused by some of using the term as an antisemitic dog whistle, to associate their critics with a Jewish conspiracy. Followers of the QAnon conspiracy theory refer to what they term "the Cabal" as a secret worldwide elite organisation who wish to undermine democracy and freedom, and implement their own globalist agendas. Hungary's prime minister Viktor Orbán has used antisemitic tropes in accusations against globalists, espousing a conspiracy theory of a world network controlled by Hungarian-American philanthropist George Soros.

See also 

 Alter-globalization
 Anti-globalization movement
 Cosmopolitanism
 Cultural imperialism
 Cultural globalization
 Dimensions of globalization
 Global capitalism
 Global warming
 Information Age
 Internationalism
 Isolationism
 New World Order (conspiracy theory)
 New world order (politics)
 Post-industrial society
 Power elite
 Ruling class
 Rootless cosmopolitan
 Techno-globalism
 United Nations

References

Works cited

Further reading

 Ankerl Guy; Coexisting Contemporary Civilizations. INUPRESS; Geneva, 2000, 
 

 
Ideologies
International relations theory
Globalization
Postmodernism
Social theories
World government